WVD can mean 

 World Vasectomy Day
 World Voice Day
 Wigner-Ville distribution, see Wigner quasiprobability distribution